Axus may refer to:

Axus or Axos, Oaxus or Oaxos, Waxus or Waxos, a city and polis (city-state) of ancient Crete
Benjamin Axus (born 1994), French judoka

See also
Axu Town, a town in the Garzê Tibetan Autonomous Prefecture of Sichuan, China
Axis (disambiguation)